The Rupelian is, in the geologic timescale, the older of two ages or the lower of two stages of the Oligocene Epoch/Series. It is preceded by the Priabonian Stage (part of the Eocene) and is followed by the Chattian Stage.

Name
The stage is named after the small river Rupel in Belgium, a tributary to the Scheldt. The Belgian Rupel Group derives its name from the same source. The name Rupelian was introduced in scientific literature by Belgian geologist André Hubert Dumont in 1850. The separation between the group and the stage was made in the second half of the 20th century, when stratigraphers saw the need to distinguish between lithostratigraphic and chronostratigraphic names.

Stratigraphic definition
The base of the Rupelian Stage (which is also the base of the Oligocene Series) is at the extinction of the foraminiferan genus Hantkenina. An official GSSP for the base of the Rupelian has been assigned in 1992 (Massignano, Italy). The transition with the Chattian has also been marked with a GSSP in August 2017 (Monte Conero, Italy).

The top of the Rupelian Stage (the base of the Chattian) is at the extinction of the foram genus Chiloguembelina (which is also the base of foram biozone P21b).

The Rupelian overlaps the Orellan, Whitneyan and lower Arikareean North American Land Mammal Ages, the upper Mustersan and Tinguirirican South American Land Mammal Ages, the uppermost Headonian, Suevian and lower Arvernian European Land Mammal Mega Zones (the Rupelian spans the Mammal Paleogene zones 21 through 24 and part of 25), and the lower Hsandgolian Asian Land Mammal Age. It is also coeval with the only regionally used upper Aldingan and lower Janjukian stages of Australia, the upper Refugian and lower Zemorrian stages of California and the lower Kiscellian Paratethys stage of Central and eastern Europe. Other regionally used alternatives include the Stampian, Tongrian, Latdorfian and Vicksburgian.

References

Literature

 ; 1850: Rapport sur la carte géologique du Royaume, Bulletins de l’Académie Royale des Sciences, des Lettres et des Beaux-Arts de Belgique 16(2), p. 351-373. 
 ; 2004: A Geologic Time Scale 2004, Cambridge University Press.

External links
 GeoWhen Database - Rupelian
 Neogene timescale (including the upper Paleogene) and Paleogene timescale, at the website of the subcommission for stratigraphic information of the ICS
 Stratigraphic chart of the Paleogene, at the website of Norges Network of offshore records of geology and stratigraphy

 
Oligocene geochronology
 
Geological ages